The 1895 Entre Nous Athletic Association football team was an American football team that represented the Entre Nous Club of Paterson, New Jersey, as an independent during the 1895 college football season.  The team shut out nine of their ten opponents and compiled a 9–1 record, losing only to the Consolidated team of Princeton University.  They outscored their opponents by a total of 328 to 12.

Schedule

References

Entre Nous Club
Athletic Club football teams and seasons
Entre Nous Club football